Hiacynt Alchimowicz (11 September 1841, Dziembrów, Vilna Governorate - after 1897, France?) was a Polish painter in the Classical style who specialized in watercolor landscapes. His older brother was the painter Kazimierz Alchimowicz.

Biography
He began his artistic studies in Vilnius with Kanuty Rusiecki. Together with Kazimierz, he participated in the January Uprising. His brother was exiled to Siberia for six years, but he was able to escape to France and settled in Perpignan, where he initially supported himself by working as a construction draftsman for a railway company.

In 1872, when the construction work ended, he resumed his studies. In 1876, he became a drawing teacher at the Polytechnic School and the women's lyceum. Later, he spent some time studying in Paris, where he made the acquaintance of Michał Elwiro Andriolli, who helped him obtain work doing some illustrations. In 1892, he was awarded the Ordre des Palmes Académiques.

He exhibited in Paris and throughout southern France. As of 1897, he was still known to be living in Perpignan. He apparently never returned to Poland, although his works were exhibited there in 1901 and 1904.

References

External links

1841 births
Year of death unknown
People from Shchuchyn District
People from Lidsky Uyezd
Emigrants from the Russian Empire to France
French people of Polish descent
19th-century Polish painters
19th-century Polish male artists
Polish landscape painters
Polish watercolourists
January Uprising participants
Recipients of the Ordre des Palmes Académiques
Polish male painters